April 22 - Eastern Orthodox liturgical calendar - April 24

All fixed commemorations below are observed on May 6 by Eastern Orthodox Churches on the Old Calendar.

For April 23, Orthodox Churches on the Old Calendar commemorate the saints listed on April 10.

Saints

 Martyrs Donatus and Therinus of Bothrotus, in Epirus (c. 250)
 Holy Glorious Great-martyr and Victory-bearer and Wonderworker George (303)
 Martyr Polychronia, mother of Great-martyr Saint George, a Greek native of Lydda (Diospolis) (303)
 Martyrs Anatolius and Protoleon, soldiers converted by witnessing the martyrdom of St. George; and martyrs Glycerius and Athanasius the Magician, at Nicomedia (303)
 Martyr Valerius, by the sword.
 Martyr Alexandra the Empress, wife of Diocletian (303) (see also: April 21)

Pre-Schism Western saints

 Martyrs Felix, Fortunatus, and Achilleus, at Valence in France (212) (see also: April 24)
 Saint Marolus, a Syrian by origin, he became Bishop of Milan in Italy in 408 (423)
 Saint Ibar of Beggerin (Iberius, Ivor), an enlightener in Ireland, who mainly preached in Leinster and Meath (5th century)
 Saint Pusinna, a holy virgin in Champagne in France who had six sisters, all widely honoured as saints (5th-6th centuries)
 Saint Gerard of Toul, Bishop of Toul in France (994)
 Saint Adalbert of Prague (Voitech), Bishop of Prague (997)

Post-Schism Orthodox saints

 Blessed George of Shenkursk, Fool-for-Christ (1462)
 New Martyr George of Cyprus, at Ptolemais (1752)
 King Solomon I of Imeretia, Georgia (1784)
 New Martyr Lazarus of Bulgaria, who suffered at Pergamus (1802)
 Blessed Sophia of Kleisoura (Myrtidiotissa in Schema), the ascetic of Kleisoura, Fool-for-Christ (1974) (see also: May 6 - ns)

New martyrs and confessors

 New Hieromartyr Priest Igor (George) of Spas Chekriak village, Russia (1918)
 New Hieromartyr John Anserov, Priest of Alma-Ata (1940)
 New Hieromartyr Sergius Zacharczuk, priest, of Nabroz, Chełm and Podlasie, Poland (1943)

Other commemorations

 Repose of Bishop Barnabas (Belyaev) of Nizhny Novgorod (1963)

Icon gallery

Notes

References

Sources
 April 23 / May 6. Orthodox Calendar (pravoslavie.ru).
 May 6 / April 23. Holy Trinity Russian Orthodox Church (A parish of the Patriarchate of Moscow).
 April 23. OCA - The Lives of the Saints.
 The Autonomous Orthodox Metropolia of Western Europe and the Americas. St. Hilarion Calendar of Saints for the year of our Lord 2004. St. Hilarion Press (Austin, TX). p. 31.
 April 23. Latin Saints of the Orthodox Patriarchate of Rome.
 The Roman Martyrology. Transl. by the Archbishop of Baltimore. Last Edition, According to the Copy Printed at Rome in 1914. Revised Edition, with the Imprimatur of His Eminence Cardinal Gibbons. Baltimore: John Murphy Company, 1916. p. 114.
 Rev. Richard Stanton. A Menology of England and Wales, or, Brief Memorials of the Ancient British and English Saints Arranged According to the Calendar, Together with the Martyrs of the 16th and 17th Centuries. London: Burns & Oates, 1892. p. 177.
Greek Sources
 Great Synaxaristes:  23 Απριλίου. Μεγασ Συναξαριστησ.
  Συναξαριστής. 23 Απριλίου. ecclesia.gr. (H Εκκλησια Τησ Ελλαδοσ). 
Russian Sources
  6 мая (23 апреля). Православная Энциклопедия под редакцией Патриарха Московского и всея Руси Кирилла (электронная версия). (Orthodox Encyclopedia - Pravenc.ru).
  23 апреля (ст.ст.) 6 мая 2013 (нов. ст.) . Русская Православная Церковь Отдел внешних церковных связей.

April in the Eastern Orthodox calendar